The 2017–18 Real Sociedad season is the club's 71st season in La Liga. This article shows player statistics and all matches (official and friendly) played by the club during the 2017–18 season.

Transfers
List of Spanish football transfers summer 2017#Real Sociedad

In

Out

Competitions

Overall

La Liga

League table

Matches

Copa del Rey

Round of 32

UEFA Europa League

Group stage

Knockout phase

Round of 32

Statistics

Appearances and goals
Last updated on 20 May 2018.

|-
! colspan=14 style=background:#dcdcdc; text-align:center|Goalkeepers

|-
! colspan=14 style=background:#dcdcdc; text-align:center|Defenders

|-
! colspan=14 style=background:#dcdcdc; text-align:center|Midfielders

|-
! colspan=14 style=background:#dcdcdc; text-align:center|Forwards

|-
! colspan=14 style=background:#dcdcdc; text-align:center| Players who have made an appearance or had a squad number this season but have left the club

|-
|}

Cards
Accounts for all competitions. Last updated on 22 December 2017.

Clean sheets
Last updated on 22 December 2017.

References

Real Sociedad seasons
Real Sociedad